Lewis Cass (1782–1866), was an American military officer, politician, and statesman

Lewis Cass may also refer to:

People
Lewis Cass Jr. (1814–1878), American diplomat, and son of the politician
Lewis Cass Hunt (1824–1886), American army general
Lewis Cass Ledyard (1852–1932), American lawyer
Lewis Cass (footballer) (born 2000), English footballer

Places
Lewis Cass High School, high school in Walton, Indiana
Lewis Cass Tech, public high school in Midtown Detroit, Michigan
Lewis Cass Building, former name of  Elliott-Larsen Building, state government building in Lansing Michigan

Other
Lewis Cass expedition, 1820 survey of Michigan territory